, Yoshiwara no Hana , and  are three hanging-scroll paintings corresponding to the themes of "moon", "flowers", and "snow", respectively. These were produced in the late 18th century by the Japanese  artist Kitagawa Utamaro for the prominent merchant Zenno Ihē.

The paintings have a reputation as Utamaro's most ambitious works. They are unusually large, and were executed in high-quality coloured pigments on imported Chinese Xuan paper. Utamaro made the paintings from about 1788 to about 1801–1804; it is not known why they took so long to complete. In the 1880s, they came into European collections and were soon split up; two are now in American collections, and the other is back in Japan. After their first known public display together in 1879, they were not exhibited together again until 2016.

Background

 art flourished in Japan during the Edo period from the 17th to 19th centuries, and took as its primary subjects courtesans, kabuki actors, geisha and others associated with the "floating world" lifestyle of the pleasure districts. Alongside paintings, mass-produced woodblock prints were a major form of the genre. In the mid-18th century, full-colour  prints became common, printed using a large number of woodblocks, one for each colour.

Kitagawa Utamaro made his name in the 1790s with his  ("large-headed pictures of beautiful women") portraits, focusing on the head and upper torso, a style others had previously employed in portraits of kabuki actors. Utamaro experimented with line, colour, and printing techniques to bring out subtle differences in the features, expressions, and backdrops of subjects from a wide variety of class and background. Utamaro's individuated beauties were in sharp contrast to the stereotyped, idealized images that had been the norm.

Utamaro is less known for his paintings than for the large number of woodblock prints he produced, of which about 2,000 are known. 53 of his paintings are known, many of which have been discovered only in the 21st century. Utamaro's paintings have received relatively little critical attention.

Execution and history

The earliest of the paintings was made  and the last . They are dated based on comparison to the styles Utamaro used in his other works. It is unknown why the paintings took so long to execute, or whether Utamaro executed them alone or with the help of those in his workshop. The paintings are unsigned, and are the only known paintings Utamaro did not sign.

The paintings were commissioned by the prominent merchant  of Shimotsuke Province (roughly modern Tochigi Prefecture). The city of Tochigi prospered as a trading centre connected by waterways to Edo (modern Tokyo); the arts also thrived there, and Utamaro had connections with those in Tochigi's  poetry circles. A find of seven Utamaro paintings in Tochigi in 1936 indicates a relationship with the city and has brought speculation that he travelled there. He is said to have visited Tochigi at least three times, though evidence of this has not been found, and the shop the Zenno family owned had an Edo branch where Utamaro could have had contact with Ihē.

The first record of the paintings' public display together was in 1879, when a member of the Zenno merchant family had them at the temple  in the city of Tochigi on 23 November 1879. It is not known what happened to the paintings after this, but at the height of the popularity of Japonism in the Western world, Yoshiwara no Hana and Fukagawa no Yuki somehow came into the possession of the Parisian art dealer Siegfried Bing, who photographed them in 1887. He bought  some years later, and a Japanese collector later purchased it and brought it back to Japan in 1939. Its whereabouts became unknown after an exhibition in 1948, until its rediscovery in 2012. The other two were purchased by American art galleries. The three were not displayed together again until 2016, when they were brought together for display at the Wadsworth Atheneum.

The paintings have a reputation as Utamaro's most ambitious works. According to the art historian Shūgō Asano, "The snow—moon—flowers paintings are extraordinary even amongst Utamaro's  paintings." To the art historian Tadashi Kobayashi, the paintings' "compositional power and dynamic postures are magnificent".

Description and analysis

The paintings are on the themes of "moon", "flowers", and "snow"; "Moon", "flowers", and "snow" was a popular traditional artistic theme in Japan. Utamaro depicts one of the three most representative officially-approved  pleasure districts in each of the paintings: Yoshiwara, Shinagawa, and Fukagawa. There are no male figures in any of the three paintings, though as the  existed for male pleasure, the exclusion was almost certainly deliberate.

The three paintings are Utamaro's largest known works. They depict extravagantly-dressed women such as courtesans and geisha of the pleasure districts; these women would have been surrounded by men demanding their services in real life, but no men appear in the paintings.

It was rare for paintings to be of such a large size. They are on Xuan paper, a type of paper made in China. Edo-period Japan had not developed the skill to make it, and as the Japanese government maintained a policy of isolation with severely restricted foreign trade, Zenno may have obtained the paper for Utamaro in secret. The inks are believed to be of a particularly high quality, from evidence such that when cleaned with water they do not smudge. Executing the paintings would have required a large working space with carefully controlled humidity. These conditions suggests a great expense went into the paintings, and point to an extremely high regard for Utamaro as an artist.

It was made  and is believed to be the first of the series. It resides in the collection of the Freer Gallery of Art in Washington, D.C.

Utamaro places 16 figures throughout the painting, all of whom are women with the exception of a young boy playing at the mid-left, and the shadow of a man smoking behind a  door further behind the boy. The point of view looks out on the sea, and the moon appears over it in the distance to the right. Utamaro uses an elevated point of view traditional to Japanese art while employing European-style geometric perspective principles to give the architecture a sense of depth. Such techniques began to have an influence on Japanese art in the 18th century. Utamaro was yet to develop a distinct style of his own at this point, and the influence of Torii Kiyonaga on his depiction of the figures is strong.

A framed  poem by Yomo no Akara (poetic pen name of Ōta Nanpo) hanging from the ceiling in the upper right reads:

Kamaya Ihē commissioned the paintings in the late 18th century.  was in the collection of the Paris-based Japanese art dealer Tadamasa Hayashi (1853–1906). In 1903 Charles Lang Freer obtained it from Hayashi and later donated it to the Freer Gallery of Art, where it now resides.

() is believed to have been the second painting executed in the series. Since 1957 it has resided in the collection of the Wadsworth Atheneum in Hartford, Connecticut.

The painting shows a  cherry blossom–viewing party in the Yoshiwara pleasure district in Edo. 45 figures appear in it. The scene is a teahouse, though one of a more exaggerated grandeur than a real one. A sign of spring,  cherry-blossom petals fall all around, and azaleas bloom in the bottom right.

The women are of different ranks and status, signified by their manner of dress and hairstyles—the more complex, the higher the rank. In the bottom left is a group of women led by high-ranking  courtesans in bright reds and blues. In the centre sits another  on a deep red carpet wearing an 

depicts a temporary brothel in Fukagawa with the theme of 'snow'. The painting resides in the collection of the Okada Museum of Art in the town of Hakone in Japan.

Utamaro achieves a strong compositional balance despite the painting's complexity. He distributes 27 figures throughout it amongst several buildings, such as a teahouse duplexes and a second-storey restaurant-teahouse at the left. The main building appears to be a two-story restaurant-teahouse; the picture focuses on an atrium with a garden court in the middle surrounded by railings, revealing the snowy outdoors. With the exception of the young boy who reaches out at a cat in the lower left, all the figures are women, though in real life the guests of a pleasure house would be men. Several of the figures pose in a manner similar to those in the book  (1804) that Utamaro illustrated around the time he completed this painting, such as the woman looking behind her in the hallway in the centre, the woman with her arm wrapped around a pillar in the centre, and the woman crouched down near her with her hand on the railing, looking to the right behind her.

Several women lean over the rails to check the snow. A woman in the bottom left stops and looks down behind her at a cat tugging at her kimono; the kimono bears the Zenno family's  crest on the shoulder. In the middle a woman carries a tray of food along the hallway. A group of guests sits around a  heating device in a room at the right. In the upper right a woman carries a large  bundle full of the courtesans' and geishas' bedclothes. Several women in a back room sit playing hand games. The women's kimono tend to be of subdued colours such as indigo or brown, in contrast with the bright, flashy colours of the other two paintings.

The  collector Takeo Nagase purchased  in Paris from an  art dealer from Japan and brought it back to Japan in 1939. It was displayed in an exhibition at the Matsuzakaya department store in the Ginza district of Tokyo in 1948. Thereafter the painting's whereabouts became unknown, and researchers made do with only black-and-white photography. The art dealer Seiichirō Teramoto rediscovered it in January 2012, and had its authenticity confirmed by Shūgō Asano. It was purchased by the Okada Museum of Art, which has declined to name who had it or where it was found. It has since had touch-up work done by a Chinese restorer.

Notes

References

Works cited

 
 
 
 
 
 
 
 
 
 
 
 
 
 
 
 
 
 

Works by Kitagawa Utamaro
Collection of the Smithsonian Institution
Maritime paintings
Moon in art